Joonas Donskoi (born 13 April 1992) is a Finnish professional ice hockey forward currently playing for the Seattle Kraken of the National Hockey League (NHL). He has also played for the San Jose Sharks and Colorado Avalanche.

Playing career
Donskoi played with Oulun Kärpät of the Finnish Liiga under coach Lauri Marjamaki. After witnessing Donskoi not standing upright enough while skating, he recommended the forward lengthen his stick. While with Kärpät, he was drafted in the 4th round (99th overall) of the 2010 NHL Entry Draft by the Florida Panthers.

Donskoi continued his offensive growth setting career high of 19 goals and 49 points in the 2014–15 season with Kärpät,

San Jose Sharks
With his NHL rights relinquished by the Panthers, Donskoi was signed to a two-year entry-level contract with the San Jose Sharks on 20 May 2015.

In his first training camp and pre-season with the Sharks, Donskoi impressed and made the club's opening night roster for the 2015–16 season. Donskoi scored his first NHL goal in his first NHL game, 7 October 2015, against Jonathan Quick of the Los Angeles Kings. Donskoi surpassed expectations with the Sharks, cementing a regular roster position amongst the Sharks offense. In 76 games with San Jose, he compiled 11 goals and 25 assists for 36 points. Helping the Sharks reach the postseason, Donskoi appeared in every game, contributing with 12 points in 23 games as the club reached the Stanley Cup finals for the first time in franchise history. In Game 3 of the 2016 Stanley Cup Finals, Donskoi scored the game-winning goal in overtime, but the team lost the series in six games to the Pittsburgh Penguins.

On 12 May 2017, the Sharks re-signed Donskoi to a two-year, $3.8 million contract.

He would record 28 goals and 31 assists over the next two seasons with the Sharks before becoming a free agent.

Colorado Avalanche
As a free agent from the Sharks, Donskoi signed a four-year, $15.6 million contract with the Colorado Avalanche on 1 July 2019. Acquired by the Avalanche to add scoring depth to the club's middle six forwards, Donskoi made his Avalanche debut on the opening night of the  season, registering 2 goals in a 5-3 victory over the Calgary Flames on 3 October 2019. Showing versatility, Donskoi played primarily alongside Nazem Kadri and Andre Burakovsky, and notched his first career hat-trick in a 9-4 blowout victory over the Nashville Predators on 7 November 2019. He made his 300th NHL regular season appearance the following game against the Columbus Blue Jackets on 9 November. He compiled a career high 14 points through the month of November, recording a career-high four points (2 goals, 2 assists), playing on the top-line in a 5-2 win against the Chicago Blackhawks on 30 November. Donskoi recorded a career-high 16 goals and added 17 assists and 33 points in 65 games before the regular season was halted in March due to the COVID-19 pandemic. In the Avalanche's return to the playoffs, Donskoi added two goals in the round-robin stage and added 6 points in just 9 post-season games before missing the club's final 5 games to injury in a second-round defeat to the Dallas Stars.

In his second season with Colorado, with added depth brought into the Avalanche line-up, Donskoi was primarily used in a third-line role alongside Tyson Jost and Valeri Nichushkin for the pandemic delayed  season. Donskoi began the season with an offensive burst, compiling 28 points through 35 games, including collecting his second career hat-trick, notching the fastest 3 goals to start a game in franchise history (7:31) in a 9-3 victory over the Arizona Coyotes on 31 March 2021. After missing 5 games through April in a COVID protocol related absence, Donskoi slowed in his production, finishing with a career high 17 goals while adding 31 points in 51 regular season games. In the opening round of the playoffs, Donskoi matched a career high of 3 points in a Game 2 victory over the St. Louis Blues on 19 May 2021. He collected five points in 10 playoff games, unable to help Colorado advance past the second round for the third consecutive year.

Seattle Kraken
On 21 July 2021, Donskoi's tenure with Colorado was cut short when he was selected from the Avalanche at the 2021 NHL Expansion Draft by the Seattle Kraken.

International play

On 2 March 2016, Donskoi was named to Team Finland's roster for the 2016 World Cup of Hockey.

Personal life 
Donskoi is one of six children; he has three brothers and two sisters. In his free time, he is interested in cars and skateboarding. After the 2019 Stanley Cup playoffs, he returned to Finland and paid off the debt of a skating park his childhood friend owned. He has Russian roots from his great-grandfather or grandfather.

Career statistics

Regular season and playoffs

International

Awards and honours

References

External links

1992 births
Living people
Colorado Avalanche players
Finnish expatriate ice hockey players in the United States
Finnish ice hockey right wingers
Finnish people of Russian descent
Florida Panthers draft picks
Oulun Kärpät players
People from Raahe
San Jose Sharks players
Seattle Kraken players
Sportspeople from North Ostrobothnia